Pouzolzia is a genus of flowering plants in the nettle family. There are about 35 species distributed throughout the tropical world. Most are shrubs, and some are herbs. The genus was named for French botanist and plant collector Pierre Marie Casimir de Pouzolz (1785–1858).

Pouzolzia hirta is used as a medicinal herb, as well as for culinary purposes, in various African and Asian countries.

People from different tribes of the state of Arunachal Pradesh in India use Poulzolozia hirta, known as "Oyik" in the local dialect, as a part of a main food course which is consumed along with rice. Oyik is prepared with smoked beef/Gayal meat (Bos frontalis) or pork, along with dried bamboo shoots, and served at various occasions and festivals.

Selected species
The following species are included:

Section Pouzolzia Gaudich. 1830

New World Species
The following species are found in the New World:
Pouzolzia formicaria (Wedd.) Wedd. 1857
Pouzolzia guatemalana (Blume) Wedd. 1869
 var. guatemalana (Blume) Wedd. 1869
 var. nivea (S. Watson) Friis & Wilmot-Dear 1996
Pouzolzia laevis (Wedd.) Wedd. 1869
Pouzolzia latistipula Friis & Wilmot-Dear 1996
Pouzolzia longipes Killip 1937
Pouzolzia nudiflora (Willd.) Friis & Wilmot-Dear 1996
Pouzolzia obliqua (Wedd.) Wedd. 1857
Pouzolzia occidentalis (Liebm.) Wedd. 1857
 var. occidentalis (Liebm.) Wedd. 1857
 var. palmeri (Liebm.) Friis & Wilmot-Dear 1996
Pouzolzia parasitica (Forssk.) Schweinf. 1896
Pouzolzia poeppigiana (Wedd.) Killip 1937
Pouzolzia pringlei Greenm. 1898
Pouzolzia purpusii Brandegee 1924
Pouzolzia scaberrima Killip 1934
Pouzolzia zeylanica (L.) Benn. 1838

Old World Species
The following species are found in the Old World:
Pouzolzia arachnoidea (Walp.) Wedd. 1869
Pouzolzia australis (Endl.) Friis & Wilmot-Dear 2004
Pouzolzia boiviniana (Blume) Wedd. 1857

Pouzolzia cymosa Wight 1853
Pouzolzia denudata De Wild. & Th. Dur. 1900
Pouzolzia fadenii Friis & Jellis 1984
Pouzolzia gaudichaudii Leandri 1951
Pouzolzia guineensis Benth. 1849
Pouzolzia herpetophyton Friis & Wilmot-Dear 2004

Pouzolzia laevigata (Poir.) Gaudich. 1830
Pouzolzia mandrarensis Leandri 1951
Pouzolzia mixta Solms 1864
 var. mixta Solms 1864
 var. shirensis (Rendle) Friis & Wilmot-Dear 2004
Pouzolzia niveotomentosa W. T. Wang 1981
Pouzolzia parasitica (Forssk.) Schweinf. 1896
Pouzolzia rubricaulis (Blume) Wedd. 1869
Pouzolzia sanguinea (Blume) Merrill 1921
 var. cinerascens (Blume) Friis & Wilmot-Dear 2004
 var. formosana (Li) Friis & Wilmot-Dear 2004
 var. fulgens (Wedd.) Hara 1975
 var. sanguinea (Blume) Merrill 1921
Pouzolzia thailandica Friis & Wilmot-Dear 2004
Pouzolzia tsaratananensis Friis & Wilmot-Dear 2004
Pouzolzia variifolia Friis & Wilmot-Dear 2004
Pouzolzia weddellii Leandri 1951
Pouzolzia zeylandica (L.) Benn. & R. Br. 1838
 var. calcicola Friis & Wilmot-Dear 2004
 var. zeylandica (L.) Benn. & R. Br. 1838

Section Memorialis Benn. & R. Br. 1838
Pouzolzia hirta (Blume) Hassk. 1844
 var. hirta (Blume) Hassk. 1844
 var. parvifolia (Wight) Friis & Wilmot-Dear 2004
Pouzolzia pentandra (Roxb.) Benn. & R. Br. 1838
 subsp. pentandra (Roxb.) Benn. & R. Br. 1838
 subsp. wightii (Benn. & R. Br.) Friis & Wilmot-Dear 2004
 var. gracilis (Miq.) Friis & Wilmot-Dear 2004
 var. wightii (Benn. & R. Br.) Friis & Wilmot-Dear 2004
Pouzolzia peteri Friis 1987

Incertae sedis
Pouzolzia floresiana Friis & Wilmot-Dear 2012
Pouzolzia rugulosa (Wedd.) Acharya & Kravtsova 2009

References

External links
Flora of Pakistan

Urticaceae
Urticaceae genera